Ernest Simon (born 23 November 1952) is an Australian fencer. He competed in the individual foil events at the 1972 and 1976 Summer Olympics. He was a longstanding member and coach with the Melbourne-based VRI Fencing Club before establishing the Melbourne Fencing Centre in 1999.

References

1952 births
Living people
Australian male fencers
Olympic fencers of Australia
Fencers at the 1972 Summer Olympics
Fencers at the 1976 Summer Olympics
Commonwealth Games medallists in fencing
Commonwealth Games silver medallists for Australia
Fencers at the 1970 British Commonwealth Games
Medallists at the 1970 British Commonwealth Games